Don Brown (born July 31, 1955) is an American college football coach and former player. He is the head football coach at the University of Massachusetts Amherst (UMass), a position he held from 2004 to 2008 and resumed prior to the 2022 season. In between his two stints as UMass, Brown was the defensive coordinator at the University of Maryland, College Park, the University of Connecticut, Boston College, the University of Michigan, and the University of Arizona. He served as the head football coach at Plymouth State University from 1993 to 1995 and Northeastern University from 2000 to 2003. Brown was also the interim head baseball coach at Yale University in 1992, tallying a mark of 26–10.

Early life and college
Brown was born in Spencer, Massachusetts, where he attended David Prouty High School. He went on to play football as a fullback at Norwich University. Brown graduated in 1977. In 1996, he earned a master's degree from Plymouth State University.

Coaching career

Early positions
Brown began his college coaching career as an assistant, first at Dartmouth, which won the Ivy League conference title during his tenure, and then at Mansfield University of Pennsylvania. In 1984, he returned to Dartmouth as its defensive coordinator. In 1987, he took the same position at Yale.

Yale baseball
Brown was named the interim head baseball coach at Yale during the 1992 season.  Brown led the Bulldogs to a 26–10 record, including a 14–4 mark in the Eastern Intercollegiate Baseball League (EIBL), the EIBL championship and a bid to the NCAA tournament.  Competing in the Midwest Regional, Yale lost the opener to Clemson, before taking an elimination game against Nichols State.  The Bulldogs were then eliminated by UCLA.

Plymouth State
In 1993, Brown assumed his first head coaching job at Plymouth State University, a Division III school, and he held that position for three seasons. During his last two years, he led the team to win the Freedom Football Conference championship and advanced to the Division III playoffs. Brown was named the Freedom Conference Coach of the Year all three of his seasons at Plymouth State. In 1994, he was also named the American Football Coaches Association District I Coach of the Year.

Assistant coach

Brown and UMass
In 1996, he took over as the defensive coordinator at Brown University, where he remained for two years. In his second season, Brown posted its best record (7–5) in 20 years and led the nation with a school record 28 interceptions and ranked second in takeaways with 36. Opponents scored an average of 19.4 points per game.

In 1998, Brown moved to the University of Massachusetts Amherst (UMass) as its defensive coordinator. That year, UMass won the Division I-AA national championship. In 1999, they earned a share of the Atlantic 10 championship and secured another berth in the Division I-AA playoffs.

Northeastern
From 2000 to 2003, Brown held his second head coaching job at Northeastern University. The season prior to his arrival, the Huskies finished with a 2–9 record. In 2000, Northeastern scored a 35–27 upset victory over Division I-A Connecticut. In 2002, he led Northeastern to an 11th-place final ranking, the school's highest-ever placement. The Huskies' ten wins were also the most in school history. That season, he was named Atlantic 10 Conference Coach of the Year, New England Football Writers Coach of the Year, and American Football Coaches Association Region I Coach of the Year. In 2003, he led the Huskies to a third-place finish in the Atlantic 10, and the eight-win season matched the second-most in school history. Northeastern was the only team to record a victory against Delaware, which went on to become the Division I-AA champions. In 2003 Brown signed a contract with Northeastern through the end of the 2009 football season, but then breached his contract in 2004 to work for UMass.

UMass
In 2004, Brown returned to UMass to take over as its head coach. During his tenure as head coach from 2004 to 2008, UMass posted the best five-year record in school history, 43–19. In his first year, he led the Minutemen to a 6–5 record, including victories over fourth-ranked Colgate, seventh-ranked , and ninth-ranked . During 2005, Brown led UMass to a 7–2 start and a final ranking of #19. That year, the Minutemen defeated fourth-ranked James Madison and handed Delaware their worst home loss in two decades, 35–7.

In 2006, Brown led Massachusetts to the Atlantic 10 conference championship and a finish as runners-up in the national championship. They ended the season ranked No. 2 with a 13–2 record. At home, he set a school record with a perfect 8–0 record in McGuirk Stadium. That season, Brown was named the AFCA Region I Coach of the Year, Atlantic 10 Coach of the Year, and New England Football Coach of the Year.

In 2007, UMass again won its conference as a member of the Colonial Athletic Association. The team advanced to the semifinals and finished the season with a No. 6 final ranking.

Second stint as assistant coach

Maryland
On January 9, 2009, the University of Maryland announced the hiring of Brown as its defensive coordinator, which filled the vacancy created by the departure of Chris Cosh. Maryland paid UMass a $25,000 buyout in accordance with the terms of Brown's contract. With a dearth of experience and talent, especially on the offensive line, Maryland suffered a 2–10 record during the 2009 season. The loss of cornerback Nolan Carroll due to a broken leg was cited as a serious detriment for the defense. The defense struggled to pressure opposing quarterbacks with the implementation of Brown's aggressive, blitz-oriented scheme. Maryland finished tied for last in the Atlantic Coast Conference in scoring defense, allowing an average of 31.2 points per game and caused just 12 turnovers and recorded 27 sacks. The lower than expected figures were attributed to a lack of players suited to the defensive scheme.

With a year of experience in Brown's defense and a stronger secondary, the unit was expected to improve during the 2010 season. Maryland rebounded with a 9–4 record and a bowl game victory, with a markedly improved defense. The Washington Post described Brown's scheme as "organized chaos" and "blitzing nearly 85 percent of the time." Highly touted junior safety Kenny Tate emerged as a playmaker, and Brown praised his play at "virtually every position on the field" as "unbelievable". Brown was credited with preparing the team well for the 2010 Military Bowl, where Maryland beat the 12th-ranked offense of East Carolina, 51–20. After the season, head coach Ralph Friedgen was fired, and Brown stated a desire to remain at Maryland on the next coaching staff.

Connecticut and Boston College
On February 4, 2011, Brown was hired as the defensive coordinator at the University of Connecticut. He kept that position until December 19, 2012, when he was hired to serve the same position at Boston College.

Michigan
On December 21, 2015, Brown was named defensive coordinator at Michigan under head coach Jim Harbaugh. Brown replaced former defensive coordinator D. J. Durkin, who had departed to take the head coaching job at Maryland. Brown was fired from  Michigan on December 22, 2020, after five seasons. Under Brown, Michigan's defense was ranked 2nd (2016), 6th (2017), 8th (2018) and 10th (2019) but dropped to 56th in 2020.

Arizona               
It was announced on January 6, 2021, that Jedd Fisch would name Brown as the defensive coordinator at the University of Arizona. After taking over, he improved Arizona’s defense from the previous 2020 season, which was the 100th ranked defense, to the 57th ranked total defense.

Second stint at UMass
In November 2021 UMass, now an FBS independent, again hired Brown as its head coach.

Coaching philosophy
Brown is regarded as one of the top defensive minds in the country. He has led FBS programs to close to a dozen top-10 national finishes in total defense, with three of those seasons in the top three. He is known for coaching aggressive, high-energy, hard-hitting defenses. Sometimes nicknamed “Dr. Blitz” for his defenses always being on the attack, he is also known for being a players' coach. He believes in players taking accountability for themselves and each other, and in leaders rising as a result. Brown stresses discipline, technique, and fundamentally sound football.

Development
Brown is known for maximizing players' potential and developing players to the next level. He has coached over 50 All-Big Ten and numerous other all-conference players. He has coached numerous NFL players and coached seven All-Americans: Devin Bush Jr., Lavert Hill, Chase Winovich, Chris Wormley, and consensus picks Maurice Hurst Jr., Jourdan Lewis, and Jabrill Peppers. At UMass he coached NFL players such as Victor Cruz, James Ihedigbo, Jeremy Cain, Emil Igwenagu, and Vladimir Ducasse.

Head coaching record

Football

References

External links
 Michigan profile

1955 births
Living people
American football running backs
Arizona Wildcats football coaches
Boston College Eagles football coaches
Brown Bears football coaches
UConn Huskies football coaches
Dartmouth Big Green football coaches
Mansfield Mounties football coaches
Maryland Terrapins football coaches
Michigan Wolverines football coaches
Northeastern Huskies football coaches
Norwich Cadets football players
Plymouth State Panthers football coaches
UMass Minutemen football coaches
Yale Bulldogs baseball coaches
Yale Bulldogs football coaches
High school football coaches in Vermont
Plymouth State University alumni
People from Spencer, Massachusetts
Coaches of American football from Massachusetts
Players of American football from Massachusetts
Baseball coaches from Massachusetts
Sportspeople from Worcester County, Massachusetts